Repeal the repeal is the name of a campaign pushed by Bernalillo County Sheriff Darren White to reinstate the death penalty in the state of New Mexico following the repeal of capital punishment by the state legislature, signed into law by Governor Bill Richardson on March 18, 2009.

The organization
RepealTheRepeal is a non-profit, non-partisan organization whose goal is reinstating the death penalty in New Mexico for "the most heinous crimes". RTR will try to achieve this goal through a multi-pronged approach.

RepealTheRepeal opened a website and distributed a movie in favor of reinstating the death penalty.

Objectives
This campaign had at least three specified objectives:
"Aggressively combat the misinformation campaign waged by the radical opponents of the death penalty and educate the public on the issue and the circumstances surrounding its repeal" ;
Begin a petition drive in order to give voters the opportunity to "repeal the repeal" of the death penalty at the ballot box, pursuant to the New Mexico Constitution ;
Urge voters to support candidates for the legislature and state office who will vote to reinstate the death penalty in New Mexico.

In an interview on the Santa Fe Reporter, Darren White said he was opposed to the death penalty for crimes other than murder.

Opinion poll
According to Public Opinion Strategies, 67% of the voters in New Mexico supported capital punishment for "the most heinous murders".

Subsequent developments
In March 2011, two attempts to reinstate capital punishment failed in the New Mexico legislature.  One bill would have reinstated the death penalty by statute; the other proposed an amendment to the state constitution which would have been put to New Mexico voters in 2012.  Both proposals were voted down by a state House committee.

See also
Capital punishment in the United States
List of people executed in New Mexico
Death Penalty Information Center
California Proposition 17 of 1972
California Proposition 7 of November 1978

References

Capital punishment in New Mexico
Prison-related organizations
New Mexico law